Thomas Odd Tofthagen (born 10 December 1973 in Rykkinn, Akershus, Norway) is a Norwegian guitarist, best known for his work in rock bands Audrey Horne and Sahg.

Musical career
The best known Tofthagen’s career began in 2002, as a live guitarist of Arve Isdal (later Enslaved member) and former Iron Maiden vocalist Paul Di'Anno. With Di'Anno, he recorded the live video The Beast in the East in 2003.

In 2002, he founded Audrey Horne with Isdal and bassist Tom Cato Visnes (King ov Hell);  the group was complete with the addition of singer Torkjell Rød, drummer Kjetil Greve and keyboardist Herbrand Larsen. Audrey Horne is one of the most recognized hard rock bands of the country. Their debut album, No Hay Banda, was winning in the Norwegian music awards Spellemannprisen in the category Best Metal Album of 2005. Tofthagen has participated in the six albums released by Audrey Horne to date.

Parallel to this, he was a constant member of the hard rock band Sahg between 2004 and 2015, recording four studio albums, until he decided to resign for personal reasons. He was replaced by Ole Walaunet.

Apart from his work in music, Tofthagen has worked as an architect full-time.

Discography

Audrey Horne
Confessions & Alcohol (EP) (2005)
No Hay Banda (2005)
Le Fol (2007)
Audrey Horne (2010)Youngblood (2013)
 Pure Heavy (2014)
 Blackout (2018)

Sahg
  Godless (EP) (2005)
  I (2006)
 II (2008)
 III (2010)Delusions of Grandeur'' (2013)

References

External links
Metallum Archvies
Discogs.com
 Audrey Horne
 Sahg

1973 births
Living people
Norwegian guitarists
Norwegian songwriters
Musicians from Bærum
Sahg members
21st-century Norwegian guitarists
Audrey Horne (band) members